Area codes 630 and 331 under the North American Numbering Plan in the United States, cover portions of Chicago's near and far western suburbs, including the majority of DuPage County, Illinois. To the northwest, the area codes also cover a small, neighboring portion of Cook County, including parts of Schaumburg, Streamwood and Hanover Park. To the west, Kane County is divided between area codes 847 and 224 in the north, including Elgin, and area codes 630 and 331 in the south, including Aurora. To the south, the northern part of Will County and a small part of southern Cook County, including the village of Burr Ridge and parts of the village of Lemont, are also included in the 630 and 331 area codes. To the southwest, the city of Yorkville, in exurban Kendall County, is included, as well.

The main area code, 630 was split off from area code 708 on August 3, 1996 in a three-way split, with the southern suburbs keeping 708 and the northern suburbs splitting into 847.  Within a decade, 630 was close to exhaustion due to the explosive growth of the Chicago suburbs and the proliferation of cell phones and pagers.  On October 7, 2007, area code 331 began overlaying area code 630, making ten-digit dialing mandatory in the area.

The Illinois side of the Chicago area–312/773/872, 708, 847/224, 630/331 and portions of 815/779–is one of the largest local calling areas in the United States; with few exceptions, no long-distance charges are applied from one portion of the metro area to another.

Communities included

 Addison
 Aurora
 Bartlett
 Batavia
 Bensenville
 Big Rock
 Bloomingdale
 Bolingbrook
 Boulder Hill
 Bristol
 Burr Ridge
 Campton Hills
 Carol Stream
 Clarendon Hills
 Darien
 Downers Grove
 Elburn
 Elmhurst
 Geneva
 Glendale Heights
 Glen Ellyn
 Hanover Park
 Hinsdale
 Itasca
 Kaneville
 La Fox
 Lemont
 Lily Lake
 Lisle
 Little Rock
 Lombard
 Medinah
 Millbrook
 Montgomery
 Mooseheart
 Naperville
 North Aurora
 Oak Brook
 Oakbrook Terrace
 Oswego
 Plano
 Plattville
 Roselle
 Schaumburg
 St. Charles
 Streamwood
 Sugar Grove
 Villa Park
 Virgil
 Warrenville
 Wayne
 Wasco
 West Chicago
 Westmont
 Wheaton
 Willowbrook
 Winfield
 Wood Dale
 Woodridge
 Yorkville

See also
 List of North American Numbering Plan area codes
 List of Illinois area codes

References

External links
Map of Illinois area codes at North American Numbering Plan Administration's website
List of exchanges from AreaCodeDownload.com, 630 Area Code
List of exchanges from AreaCodeDownload.com, 331 Area Code

630
630
Telecommunications-related introductions in 1996
Telecommunications-related introductions in 2007